Estonian Floorball Union (abbreviation EFU) is one of the sport governing bodies in Estonia which deals with floorball.

EFU is established on 27 November 1993. EFU is a member of International Floorball Federation and Estonian Olympic Committee.

References

External links
 

Sports governing bodies in Estonia
Floorball in Estonia